Just Duet is an Indonesian singing talent search produced by FremantleMedia with NET. Winner of Just Duet will get a chance to make an album recorded with one of judges from Just Duet which will be produced by Steve Lillywhite. Inspired by Duets on ABC

Indonesian reality television series
Talent shows